Alberta Provincial Highway No. 12, commonly referred to as Highway 12, is an east-west highway through central Alberta. It runs from Highway 22, through Lacombe and Stettler, to the Alberta-Saskatchewan border. It generally runs parallel to Highway 13 to the north.

Route description
It continues along the south of Gull Lake and the summer village of Gull Lake, before intersecting Highway 2 (Queen Elizabeth II Highway). East of Highway 2, it passes through the city of Lacombe as 50 Avenue before continues east past the village of Clive. At the intersection of Highway 50 near Tees, Highway 12 turns southeast, passing through the village of Alix and shares a short concurrency with Highway 21, before turning east at Highway 11 near Nevis. It passes through Erskine before it enters Stettler and intersects Highway 56. East of Stettler, it passes Botha, Gadsby, and Halkirk before turning southeast. It passes through Castor, intersects Highway 36 (Veterans Memorial Highway), and passes through Fleet, Coronation, Throne, and Veteran. It shares a  concurrency with Highway 41 (Buffalo Trail) between Consort and Monitor before continuing past Kirriemuir and Altario, finally reaching the Saskatchewan border near Compeer where it continues as Saskatchewan Highway 51.

History
In January 1988, the section north of Bentley was renumbered to Highway 20 while Highway 51, which at the time traveled west from Bentley and terminated at Highway 761 north of Leslieville, became part of Highway 12. In the 1990s, Highway 12 was extended west to Highway 22.

Major intersections 
From west to east:

Highway 12A 

Alberta Provincial Highway No. 12A is the designation of a  alternate route off Highway 12 serving the south shore of Gull Lake.

In 2017, Highway 12 was designated along the new roadway while the former alignment became Highway 12A.

References 

012